iHeartRadio Countdown is a globally-syndicated, independent song countdown radio program. The countdown is based on the popular iHeartRadio, an Internet radio platform owned by iHeartMedia, Inc. (formerly Clear Channel Broadcasting, Inc.) The show premiered on January 14, 2014 on selected iHeartMedia-owned stations, and is syndicated by Premiere Networks and ARN in Australia. Internationally, the show airs on Shanghai's KFM 98.1 and the Cayman Islands' X107.1. 

As of 2018, the iHeartRadio Countdown is currently aired in two editions: the CHR edition (hosted by KIIS-FM’s JoJo Wright since 2018; previously it was hosted by Romeo since its launch) and the Hot AC edition (hosted by Mario Lopez).

Top Songs of the Year
On December 26, 2013, iHeartRadio launched a similar "Top Songs of the Year" which was broadcast on Clear Channel-owned CHR stations (such as Z100 New York, KIIS-FM Los Angeles, etc.) in comply to those stations' year end charts from the previous years, usually before New Year's Day. From 2014-2017, the top 100 songs were counted down, but after JoJo Wright took over as host in 2018 it was reduced to 50 songs. The No. 1 songs each year (beginning with the launch year, 2013) are:

 2013: "Blurred Lines" by Robin Thicke feat. Pharrell and T.I.
 2014: "Dark Horse" by Katy Perry feat. Juicy J
 2015: "Uptown Funk" by Mark Ronson feat. Bruno Mars
 2016: "Love Yourself" by Justin Bieber
 2017: "Shape of You" by Ed Sheeran
 2018: "Perfect" By Ed Sheeran
 2019: "Sucker" By Jonas Brothers
 2020: "Blinding Lights" by The Weeknd
 2021: "Stay" by The Kid Laroi and Justin Bieber

International versions
In Australia, selected KIIS stations airing the local version of the same name. But unlike the U.S. version of the chart, the top 20 songs from both international and Australian acts were aired. It is hosted by KIIS 106.5 Sydney host Kian.

In New Zealand, ZM also airs the local version of the show (entitled ZM's iHeartRadio Official Countdown), bringing the top 40 songs on the chart. The show broadcasts every Saturday from 2pm to 5pm on all ZM stations nationwide, and is hosted by Cam.

in Canada, iHeartRadio Launched a similar program called "iHeartRadio Top 20", Airs Weekends on Canadian Orbyt Media Affiliated stations in  two languages. English is Hosted by Andrea Collins from Toronto and French is hosted by Patrick Langlois From Montreal.

References

External links
iHeartRadio Countdown on Premiere Networks
Listen to iHeartRadio Countdown on iHeartRadio

2014 radio programme debuts
American music radio programs
IHeartRadio digital channels
Music chart shows